is a Japanese mixed martial artist, currently competing in the strawweight division of ONE Championship. He is currently ranked #5 in the ONE Championship strawweight rankings.  

A professional competitor since 2008, he is the former ONE Strawweight Champion and former Shooto World Flyweight (114lbs) Champion.

Personal life
Saruta was born in Kawaguchi, Saitama, Japan. Saruta was active in extracurricular activities in his youth, and had a focus on gymnastics. He wanted to become an Olympic athlete for his country. When he was 18, Saruta saw Norifumi Yamamoto on television and decided to begin training in mixed martial arts.

He is married.

Martial arts career

Shooto
Saruta made his professional MMA debut on January 26, 2008 at Shooto: Back to Our Roots 7 against Kota Funaki. He would lose the bout by TKO.

On August 9, 2009, Saruta got his first professional victory over Takahiro Kohori at Shooto: Gig Saitama 1 by first-round TKO.

Between August 2011 and April 2013, Saruta had his first-ever winning streak. He won five consecutive bouts in Shooto with two submissions and a knockout during the run. During this run, he won the Shooto Infinity Bantamweight tournament, with a majority decision win over Masumi Tozawa. This would earn him a title shot versus Ryuichi Miki. Their first bout ended in a draw, and their second in a unanimous decision loss for Saruta. After early failed attempts at winning Shooto titles, Saruta moved to Tokyo and changed camps to begin training with Wajutsu Keishukai Hearts.

After an up-and-down stretch that saw Saruta go 3-4-1, the Japanese fighter began another five-match unbeaten streak that would lead to a flyweight title shot against Ryuto Sawada. On October 15, 2017, Saruta defeated Sawada by knockout in the fourth round to capture the Shooto flyweight championship. Following that, he achieved a decision win over Kiyotaka Shimizu and defended his title against Itchaku Murata, winning by way of TKO.

ONE Championship
On December 7, 2018, Saruta made his ONE Championship debut against former strawweight champion, Alex Silva. He won by unanimous decision.

The victory in his ONE Championship debut earned Saruta a title shot against Joshua Pacio. On January 19, 2019, Saruta edged out Pacio by split decision to win the ONE strawweight world championship.

Yosuke Saruta would fight a rematch with Joshua Pacio at ONE: Roots of Honor. Saruta lost the bout, after being knocked out by a knee in the fourth round.

At ONE Century, Saruta bounced back with a KO victory over the Pancrase strawweight champion Daichi Kitakata, stopping his opponent in the first minute of the second round.

Saruta next faced Yoshitaka Naito at Road to One 3: Tokyo Fight Night on September 10, 2020. He won the fight via unanimous decision.

Saruta faced Joshua Pacio in a trilogy match for the ONE Strawweight Championship at ONE Championship: Revolution on September 24, 2021. He lost the bout via TKO in the first round.

Saruta was expected to face Gustavo Balart at ONE: Bad Blood on February 11, 2022. Saruta withdrew from the bout, after testing positive for COVID-19 on the day of the event. The fight was rescheduled for ONE 156 on April 22, 2022. Saruta lost the fight by unanimous decision.

Championships and accomplishments 

 ONE Championship
 ONE Strawweight Championship (One time; former)
 Shooto
 Shooto World Flyweight (114lbs) Championship (One time)
 One successful title defense 
 2012 Infinity Bantamweight Tournament 
2018 Fighter of the Year
eFight.jp
Fighter of the Month for January 2019
Fighter of the Month for October 2019

Mixed martial arts record 

|-
|Loss
|align=center|21–11–3
| Gustavo Balart
| Decision (unanimous)
| ONE 156
| 
|align=center|3
|align=center|5:00
| Kallang, Singapore
| 
|-
| Loss
| align=center|21–10–3
| Joshua Pacio
| TKO (punches)
| ONE Championship: Revolution
| 
| align=center|1	
| align=center|3:38 
| Kallang, Singapore
| 
|-
| Win
| align=center|21–9–3
| Yoshitaka Naito
| Decision (unanimous)
| Road to ONE 3: Tokyo Fight Night
| 
| align=center|3
| align=center|5:00
| Tokyo, Japan
|
|-
| Win
| align=center | 20–9–3
| Daichi Kitakata
| KO (punches)
| ONE Championship: Century
| 
| align=center | 2
| align=center | 0:59
| Tokyo, Japan
| 
|-
| Loss
| align=center | 19–9–3
| Joshua Pacio
| KO (head kick)
| ONE Championship: Roots of Honor
| 
| align=center | 4
| align=center | 2:43
| Pasay, Philippines
| 
|-
| Win
| align=center | 19–8–3
| Joshua Pacio
| Decision (split)
| ONE Championship: Eternal Glory
| 
| align=center | 5
| align=center | 5:00
| Jakarta, Indonesia
| 
|-
| Win
| align=center | 18–8–3
| Alex Silva
| Decision (unanimous)
| ONE Championship: Destiny of Champions
| 
| align=center | 3
| align=center | 5:00
| Kuala Lumpur, Malaysia
|  Return to flyweight.
|-
| Loss
| align=center | 17–8–3
| Takumi Tamaru
| TKO (doctor stoppage) 
| Shooto: Shooto Professional 7/15
| 
| align=center | 3
| align=center | 3:49
| Tokyo, Japan
| 
|-
| Win
| align=center | 17–7–3
| Itchaku Murata
| KO (punches)
| Shooto: Shooto Professional 5/13
| 
| align=center | 3
| align=center | 0:45
| Kawasaki, Kanagawa, Japan
| 
|-
| Win
| align=center | 16–7–3
| Kiyotaka Shimizu
| Decision (unanimous)
| Shooto: Shooto Professional 1/28
| 
| align=center | 3
| align=center | 5:00
| Tokyo, Japan
| 
|-
| Win
| align=center| 15–7–3
| Ryuto Sawada
| KO (punches)
| Shooto: Shooto Professional10/15
| 
| align=center|4
| align=center|2:37
| Urayasu, Chiba, Japan
| 
|-
| Win
| align=center| 14–7–3
| Koha Minowa
| Decision (unanimous)
| Shooto: Shooto Professional 4/23
| 
| align=center|3
| align=center|5:00
| Urayasu, Chiba, Japan
|
|-
| Draw
| align=center| 13–7–3
| Junji Ito
| Draw (majority)
| Shooto: Shooto Professional 1/29
| 
| align=center|3
| align=center|5:00
| Tokyo, Japan
|
|-
| Win
| align=center| 13–7–2
| Luis Gonzalez
| Decision (unanimous)
| Shooto: Shooto Professional 7/17
| 
| align=center|3
| align=center|5:00
| Tokyo, Japan
|
|-
| Win
| align=center| 12–7–2
| Teppei Maeyama
| Decision (unanimous)
| Shooto: Shooto Professional 3/21
| 
| align=center|2
| align=center|5:00
| Tokyo, Japan
|
|-
| Win
| align=center| 11–7–2
| Hiroshi Roppongi
| KO (punch)
| Shooto: Shooto Professional 1/11
| 
| align=center|2
| align=center|0:18
| Tokyo, Japan
| 
|-
| Loss
| align=center| 10–7–2
| Hiromasa Ougikubo
| Decision (unanimous)
| Shooto: Professional Shooto 11/29
| 
| align=center|3
| align=center|5:00
| Tokyo, Japan
|
|-
| Win
| align=center| 10–6–2
| Taku Kajikawa
| Decision (unanimous)
| Shooto: Professional Shooto 7/26
| 
| align=center|3
| align=center|5:00
| Tokyo, Japan
|
|-
| Loss
| align=center| 9–6–2
| Hayato Suzuki
| Decision (unanimous)
| Grandslam MMA 2: Way of the Cage
| 
| align=center|3
| align=center|5:00
| Tokyo, Japan
|
|-
| Loss
| align=center| 9–5–2
| Mamoru Yamaguchi
| TKO (doctor stoppage)
| Vale Tudo Japan: VTJ 6th
| 
| align=center|2
| align=center|0:25
| Tokyo, Japan
|
|-
| Win
| align=center| 9–4–2
| Shunichi Shimizu
| Decision (unanimous)
| Grandslam MMA 1: Way of the Cage
| 
| align=center|3
| align=center|5:00
| Tokyo, Japan
|
|-
| Win
| align=center| 8–4–2
| Masaaki Sugawara
| Decision (majority)
| Shooto: Gig Tokyo 16
| 
| align=center|3
| align=center|5:00
| Tokyo, Japan
|
|-
| Loss
| align=center| 7–4–2
| Ryuichi Miki
| Decision (unanimous)
| Shooto: 5th Round 2013
| 
| align=center|5
| align=center|5:00
| Tokyo, Japan
| 
|-
| Draw
| align=center| 7–3–2
| Ryuichi Miki
| Draw (split)
| Shooto: 3rd Round 2013
| 
| align=center|5
| align=center|5:00
| Tokyo, Japan
| 
|-
| Win
| align=center| 7–3–1
| Kentaro Watanabe
| KO (punches)
| Shooto: Border: Season 5 - First
| 
| align=center|1
| align=center|3:52
| Osaka, Japan
| 
|-
| Win
| align=center| 6–3–1
| Masumi Tozawa
| Decision (majority)
| Shooto: The Rookie Tournament Final 2012
| 
| align=center| 3
| align=center| 5:00
| Tokyo, Japan
| 
|-
| Win
| align=center| 5–3–1
| Yuki Nishigo
| Technical Submission (guillotine choke)
| Shooto: Gig Tokyo 11
| 
| align=center| 1
| align=center| 3:26
| Tokyo, Japan
| 
|-
| Win
| align=center| 4–3–1
| Hiroshi Osato
| Decision (unanimous)
| Shooto: Gig Tokyo 9
| 
| align=center| 2
| align=center| 5:00
| Tokyo, Japan
| 
|-
| Win
| align=center| 3–3–1
| Akinobu Watanabe
| Submission (rear-naked choke)
| Shooto: Gig Tokyo 7
| 
| align=center| 1
| align=center| 1:00
| Tokyo, Japan
| 
|-
|  Loss
| align=center| 2–3–1
| Tatsuya Nakashima
| TKO (arm injury)
| Shooto: Shooting Disco 11: Tora Tora Tora!
| 
| align=center| 1
| align=center| 1:54
| Tokyo, Japan
| 
|-
| Draw
| align=center| 2–2–1
| Nozumi Otsuka
| Draw (split)
| Shooto: The Rookie Tournament 2009 Final
| 
| align=center| 3
| align=center| 5:00
| Tokyo, Japan
| 
|-
| Win
| align=center| 2–2
| Jun Nagasoe
| Decision (unanimous)
| Shooto: Gig Tokyo 3
| 
| align=center| 2
| align=center| 5:00
| Tokyo, Japan
| 
|-
| Win
| align=center| 1–2
| Takahiro Kohori
| TKO (punches)
| Shooto: Gig Saitama 1
| 
| align=center| 1
| align=center| 3:06
| Fujimi, Saitama, Japan
| 
|-
| Loss
| align=center| 0–2
| Nozomi Otsuka
| TKO (corner stoppage)
| Shooto: Shooting Disco 5: Earth, Wind and Fighter
| 
| align=center| 2
| align=center| 3:25
| Tokyo, Japan
| 
|-
| Loss
| align=center| 0–1
| Kota Funaki
| TKO (towel, punches)
| Shooto: Back to Our Roots 7
| 
| align=center| 2
| align=center| 2:22
| Tokyo, Japan
|

See also 
 List of male mixed martial artists
 List of current ONE fighters
 List of Shooto champions
 List of ONE Championship champions

References

External links
 Yosuke Saruta at ONE

1987 births
Living people
People from Kawaguchi, Saitama
Japanese male mixed martial artists
Strawweight mixed martial artists
Mixed martial artists utilizing Brazilian jiu-jitsu
Japanese practitioners of Brazilian jiu-jitsu
Sportspeople from Saitama Prefecture
ONE Championship champions